Kory DeShaun Minor (born December 14, 1976) is a former American football linebacker. He played 30 games in four seasons for the Carolina Panthers. Minor was an outside linebacker at Notre Dame from 1995–1998, while recording 245 tackles (43.5 for loss) and five interceptions. He was a seventh-round pick in the 1999 NFL Draft, selected 234th overall by the San Francisco 49ers.

A native of Inglewood, California, Minor attended Bishop Amat High School in La Puente, California, where he was a teammate of Daylon McCutcheon. He had 20 ½ sacks as a senior while earning consensus All-America notice and being named Defensive Player of the Year by USA Today. 

Minor is a former owner of multiple Domino's Pizza franchises in California. In the summer of 2009, he began appearing in Domino's American Legends pizza commercials. He promotes the Cali Chicken Bacon Ranch pizza in a face off against the Memphis BBQ Chicken pizza, whose promoter suggests that Minor "put some South in his mouth."

After selling his franchises, Minor founded Kory Minor Industries which is a training and development company for individuals and organizations specializing in helping clients to "Get Off the Sideline and Get Into the Game by fostering the concept of WINNING."

Minor currently coaches high school football for the St. Margaret's Tartans in San Juan Capistrano, California. He has been the head coach at SMES since 2018.

References

1976 births
Living people
Players of American football from Inglewood, California
American football linebackers
Notre Dame Fighting Irish football players
Carolina Panthers players